Quaker City is an unincorporated community in Albany Township in Berks County, Pennsylvania, United States. Quaker City is located along Quaker City Road at the base of Blue Mountain.

References

Unincorporated communities in Berks County, Pennsylvania
Unincorporated communities in Pennsylvania